Sergiu Epureanu (born 12 September 1976) is a Moldovan former footballer.

International career
Epureanu has made 46 appearances and has scored 3 goals for the Moldova national football team.

International goals
Scores and results list Moldova's goal tally first.

References

External links

1976 births
Living people
People from Cantemir District
Moldovan footballers
Association football midfielders
Moldova international footballers
Moldovan expatriate footballers
Expatriate footballers in Turkey
Moldovan expatriate sportspeople in Turkey
Expatriate footballers in Russia
Moldovan expatriate sportspeople in Russia
Expatriate footballers in Ukraine
Moldovan expatriate sportspeople in Ukraine
Expatriate footballers in Kazakhstan
Moldovan expatriate sportspeople in Kazakhstan
Expatriate footballers in Belarus
Moldovan expatriate sportspeople in Belarus
Moldovan Super Liga players
Süper Lig players
Ukrainian Premier League players
Russian Premier League players
FC Zimbru Chișinău players
Samsunspor footballers
İstanbulspor footballers
FC Sokol Saratov players
FC Vorskla Poltava players
FC Kryvbas Kryvyi Rih players
FC Nistru Otaci players
FC Taraz players
FC Milsami Orhei players
FC Academia Chișinău players
FC Neman Grodno players